A Master of Journalism (abbreviated M.J., M.S.J., M.M.J.C., M.A. in Journalism, or M.S. in Journalism) is a master's degree awarded to students who have studied journalism at a graduate level. Like other master's degree programs, master of journalism programs are typically between one and two years.

While some Master of Journalism programs are focused on the academic study of journalism, most are geared towards providing students with journalism skills. Students are usually required to take courses on writing and reporting as well as media law and ethics. Many programs have an internship or co-op component in which students will complete a placement at a working newsroom, magazine office, or other media production outlet. Some programs allow students to specialize in a particular type of journalism, such as broadcast journalism, newspapers, magazines, or online journalism.

Master of Journalism in Canada 
Master of Journalism (M.J. or M.M.J.C.) programs are offered at the following Canadian Universities:
Ryerson University, Toronto, Ontario
University of Western Ontario, London, Ontario
Carleton University, Ottawa, Ontario
University of British Columbia, Vancouver, British Columbia
University of King's College, Halifax, Nova Scotia
University of Regina, Regina, Saskatchewan

Master of Journalism in the United States

Alabama
 Department of Journalism and Creative Media, The University of Alabama (M.A.)

Arizona
 Walter Cronkite School of Journalism and Mass Communication, Arizona State University (M.A.)  
 School of Journalism, College of Social and Behavioral Sciences, the University of Arizona (M.A.)

Arkansas
 School of Journalism and Strategic Media, J. William Fulbright College of Arts and Sciences, the University of Arkansas (M.A.)

California
 UC Berkeley Graduate School of Journalism, the University of California at Berkeley (M.J.)
 Annenberg School for Communication and Journalism, the University of Southern California (M.S.)
 Graduate Program in Journalism, Stanford University (M.A.)

Colorado
 School of Journalism and Mass Communication, the University of Colorado at Boulder (M.A.)
 Department of Journalism and Technical Communication, Colorado State University (M.S.)

District of Columbia
 School of Communication, American University (M.A.)

Florida
 School of Communication, University of Miami (M.A.) 
 Department of Journalism and Media Studies, University of South Florida (M.A.)

Georgia
 Henry W. Grady College of Journalism and Mass Communication, the University of Georgia (M.A.)

Illinois
 College of Communications, University of Illinois (M.J., M.S.) 
 Medill School of Journalism, Northwestern University (M.S.J.)

Indiana
 College of Communication, Information, and Media, Ball State University (M.A.)

Iowa
 School of Journalism and Mass Communication, the University of Iowa (M.A.)
 Greenlee School of Journalism and Communication, Iowa State University (M.S.)

Kansas
 William Allen White School of Journalism, the University of Kansas (M.S.)
 A.Q. Miller School of Journalism and Mass Communications, Kansas State University (M.S.)

Maryland
 Philip Merrill College of Journalism, the University of Maryland (M.J.)

Massachusetts
 Department of Journalism, Boston University (M.S.) 
 Department of Journalism, Emerson College (M.A.)
 School of Journalism, Northeastern University (M.A.)
 Division of Continuing Education, Harvard Extension School (M.L.A.)

Michigan
 School of Journalism, Michigan State University (M.A.)

Mississippi
 School of Journalism and New Media, the University of Mississippi (M.A.)

Missouri
 Missouri School of Journalism, the University of Missouri (M.A.)

Montana
 School of Journalism, the University of Montana (M.A., Environmental Science and Natural Resource Journalism)

Nebraska
 Department of Journalism, University of Nebraska (M.A.)

Nevada
 Hank Greenspun School of Journalism and Media Studies, University of Nevada Las Vegas, (M.A.) 
 Reynolds School of Journalism, at the University of Nevada, Reno (M.A.)

New York
 Columbia University Graduate School of Journalism, Columbia University (M.S., M.S. Data, M.A.) 
 Arthur L. Carter Journalism Institute, New York University (M.A.) 
 Craig Newmark Graduate School of Journalism, City University of New York (M.A.)
 S. I. Newhouse School of Public Communications, Syracuse University (M.A., M.S.)

North Carolina
 Hussman School of Journalism and Media, the University of North Carolina at Chapel Hill (M.A.)

Ohio
 School of Journalism and Mass Communication, Kent State University(M.A.) 
 E. W. Scripps School of Journalism, Ohio University(M.S.)

Oklahoma
 Gaylord College of Journalism and Mass Communication, University of Oklahoma(M.A.

Oregon
 School of Journalism and Communication, the University of Oregon (M.A.)

Pennsylvania 
 School of Communication, Point Park University (M.A.) 
 School of Communications and Theater, Temple University (M.A.)

Texas
 Moody College of Communication, University of Texas at Austin (M.A.)
 Department of Journalism, Public Relations and New Media, Baylor University (M.A., M.I.J.)
 Mayborn School of Journalism, the University of North Texas (M.A., M.J.)

Virginia 
 School of Communication and the Arts, Regent University (M.A.)

West Virginia
 W. Page Pitt School of Journalism and Mass Communications, Marshall University (M.A.) 
 Perley Isaac Reed School of Journalism, West Virginia University (M.S.)

Wisconsin
 School of Journalism and Mass Communication, the University of Wisconsin–Madison (M.A.)

References

External links 

 U.S. Masters Journalism Programs

Master's degrees